I Did It For Love is a song written by Kristian Wejshag and Lars "Dille" Diedricson and performed by Jessica Andersson.

The song was selected as one of the competing songs in Melodifestivalen 2010, a song competition to represent Sweden at the Eurovision Song Contest. The song came third in the first semi-final on 6 February 2010 and processed to the second chance round where it knocked out  Alcazar's song "Headlines" and Kalle Moreaus and Orsa spelmän's "Underbart", progressing to the final on 13 March 2010, where is placed 8th.

The single was released in February 2010 and peaked at number 13 on the Swedish Singles Chart. The song was named the "2010 Svensktoppen song of the year".

Track listing
CD single
 "I Did It for Love"
 "I Did It for Love"  (Karaoke Version)

Charts

Release history

References 

2009 songs
2010 singles
English-language Swedish songs
Jessica Andersson songs
Melodifestivalen songs of 2010
Songs written by Lars Diedricson